Aimé Majorique Beauparlant (January 4, 1864 – August 19, 1911) was a Canadian politician.

Born in St-Aimé, Richelieu County, Canada East, Beauparlant was educated at the College of St-Aimé and St. Hyacinthe Seminary. He studied law under Honore Mercier and was the editor of L' Union, a weekly newspaper in St. Hyacinthe. He was first elected to the House of Commons of Canada for the electoral district of St. Hyacinthe in the general elections of 1904. A Liberal, he was re-elected in 1908. He died in 1911.

Electoral record

References
 
 The Canadian Parliament; biographical sketches and photo-engravures of the senators and members of the House of Commons of Canada. Being the tenth Parliament, elected November 3, 1904

1864 births
1911 deaths
Liberal Party of Canada MPs
Members of the House of Commons of Canada from Quebec